Rozhdestveno is a rural locality (a selo) in Valuysky District, Belgorod Oblast, Russia. The population was 1,499 as of 2010. There are 21 streets.

Geography 
Rozhdestveno is located 12 km northeast of Valuyki (the district's administrative centre) by road. Borisovo is the nearest rural locality.

References 

Rural localities in Valuysky District